Poul Henrik Peder Hansen (20 October 1891 – 29 October 1948) was a Danish wrestler who competed in the 1920 Summer Olympics, and in the 1924 Summer Olympics. He was born in Ubberud, Odense Municipality and died in Aarhus.

In 1920 he won the silver medal in the Greco-Roman heavyweight competition after winning the final of the silver medal round against Edward Willkie. Four years later he competed in the Greco-Roman heavyweight event as well as in the freestyle wrestling light-heavyweight class but was not able to win a medal.

References

External links
 

1891 births
1948 deaths
Olympic wrestlers of Denmark
Wrestlers at the 1920 Summer Olympics
Wrestlers at the 1924 Summer Olympics
Danish male sport wrestlers
Olympic silver medalists for Denmark
Olympic medalists in wrestling
Medalists at the 1920 Summer Olympics
People from Odense Municipality
Sportspeople from the Region of Southern Denmark
19th-century Danish people
20th-century Danish people